Acacia repanda is a shrub belonging to the genus Acacia and the subgenus Juliflorae that is endemic to a small area in western Australia.

Description
The single stemmed and multi-branched plant has minni-ritchi bark and branchlets that have spreading hairs. Like most species of Acacia it has phyllodes rather than true leaves. The patent to ascending evergreen phyllodes are terete to flat with a linear to linear-oblanceolate shape that is slightly to moderately incurved. It blooms from June to August producing yellow flowers. After flowering coriaceous seed pods with a narrowly oblong shape form that are strongly undulate.

Distribution
It is native to a small area in the southern Wheatbelt region of Western Australia where it has a disjunct distribution with the bulk of the population being found in the area around Holt Rock with a small population found in Wongan Hills. It is often situated around outcrops of granite growing in sandy loam or loamy soils as a part of heath or shrubland communities.

See also
List of Acacia species

References

repanda
Acacias of Western Australia
Plants described in 1995
Taxa named by Bruce Maslin